Tylomyini is a tribe of New World rats and mice in the subfamily Tylomyinae. The rats share the characteristics of all being climbing rats.

Classification
Tribe Tylomyini
GenusTylomys
Chiapan climbing rat, Tylomys bullaris
Fulvous-bellied climbing rat, Tylomys fulviventer
Mira climbing rat, Tylomys mirae
Peters's climbing rat, Tylomys nudicaudus
Panamanian climbing rat, Tylomys panamensis
Tumbala climbing rat, Tylomys tumbalensis
Watson's climbing rat, Tylomys watsoni
Genus Ototylomys
Big-eared climbing rat, Ototylomys phyllotis
La Pera big-eared climbing rat, Ototylomys chiapensis

Tylomyinae
Mammal tribes
Taxa named by Osvaldo Reig